José Ramón Muro Pereg (born 14 July 1954 in Bilbao, Vizcaya) is a Spanish painter. He specializes in hyperrealist paintings.

Biography

Early life 
Born in Bilbao in 1954, Muro began painting from childhood. At age 22 he presented his first solo exhibition. At this time he was a pupil of the Basque painter José Luis Aldecoa, but his technical training influenced his painting framed in pop art with a tendency towards hyperrealism. He combined painting with artistic forms such as documentary cinema and photography, while working as an engineer. This economic independence made his passion for painting not contaminated by commercial purposes and passing trends.

Figurative painting 
On the border of hyperrealism, natural landscapes, urban landscapes, portraits and other more classic framed within imaginative realism are some of his most outstanding works. He typically applies acrylic paint on wooden canvas and applies mixed techniques.

Exhibitions and painting competitions 
Since 2010, he takes up his dedication with painting and his art is evolving, beginning then for him a period of prosperity, participating international competitions, art fair exhibitions and attending workshops with the most outstanding Spanish realist painters of this time.

Pictorial style trends 
The stages of José Ramón Muro's life are reflected in his works, particularly in the imaginative realism of classical touches, a genre that the artist cultivated throughout his career. He will be remembered especially for his masterful paintings on the border with hyperrealism, for the meticulous preparation of the chosen theme, a refined technique, a careful composition and the inclusion of nuances that enrich the perspective on the whole. The well-defined vanishing lines that emphasize the perspective in addition to great contrasts are a general style present in his paintings. In the creations of the last years, the painter raises all his achievements to the level of maturity, the style achieved through years and effort, and manifests an absolute mastery of pictorial techniques.

References 

Living people
1954 births
People from Bilbao
21st-century Spanish painters
20th-century Spanish painters
20th-century Spanish male artists
Spanish male painters
21st-century Spanish male artists